Naad (K.D.) is a village in the southern state of Karnataka, India. It is located in the Indi taluk of Bijapur district in Karnataka. It is about 17 km from Indi.

Villages in Bijapur district, Karnataka